Richard A. Smith (1932–2017) was an African American physician who was part of the five-person team composing the Surgeon General's Office of Equal Health Opportunity (OEHO), which was charged with desegregating US hospitals in the mid-1960s. Smith developed one of the first Physician Assistant (PA) training programs in the US, MEDEX, and later founded MEDEX International.

Early life and education 
Smith obtained a BS and an MD from Howard University in 1953 and 1957, respectively. He completed his residency in public health and preventive medicine at the University of Washington. Smith obtained an MPH from Columbia University in 1960.

Awards and honors 
Smith was elected into the National Academy of Medicine in 1972. He received a Rockefeller Public Service Award in 1981 "for developing new methods of health care" and a Retired Commissioned Officers Recognition Award from the US Public Health Service in 1999.

Select publications

References 

African-American physicians
1932 births
2017 deaths
20th-century African-American people
21st-century African-American people
Members of the National Academy of Medicine